The Second Quebec Conference (codenamed "OCTAGON") was a high-level military conference held during World War II by the British and American governments. The conference was held in Quebec City, September 12 – September 16, 1944, and was the second conference to be held in Quebec, after "QUADRANT" in August 1943. The chief representatives were Winston Churchill, Franklin D. Roosevelt and the Combined Chiefs of Staff.  Canada's Prime Minister  William Lyon Mackenzie King was the host but did not attend the key meetings.

Agreements were reached on the following topics: Allied occupation zones in defeated Germany, the Morgenthau Plan to demilitarize Germany, continued U.S. Lend-Lease aid to Britain, and the role of the Royal Navy in the war against Japan. Based on the Hyde Park Aide-Mémoire, they made plans to drop the atomic bomb on Japan.

See also
 List of World War II conferences

Further reading
 Bernier, Serge. "Mapping Victory," Beaver (2008) 88#1 pp 69–72
 John L. Chase "The Development of the Morgenthau Plan Through the Quebec Conference" The Journal of Politics, Vol. 16, No. 2 (May, 1954), pp. 324–359

Primary sources
 United States Department of State Foreign relations of the United States, Conference at Quebec, 1944

External links

 BBC Factfile: Second Quebec Conference

World War II conferences
History of Quebec City
Diplomatic conferences in Canada
1944 conferences
1944 in Canada
1944 in international relations
Canada–United States relations
United Kingdom–United States relations
Canada–United Kingdom relations
1944 in Quebec
September 1944 events